Sir Elf is a solo piano album by Roland Hanna recorded in New York in 1973 and released by the Choice label.

Reception

AllMusic reviewer Scott Yanow stated: "Pianist Roland Hanna's first solo album is one of his finest recordings. ... Hanna is in top form on this well-paced and inventive set".

Track listing
 "Yours Is My Heart Alone" (Franz Lehár) – 6:56
 "Night of My Nights" (Alexander Borodin, Robert Wright, George Forrest) – 3:27
 "You Took Advantage of Me" (Richard Rodgers, Lorenz Hart) – 4:57
 "Killing Me Softly with His Song" (Charles Fox, Norman Gimbel) – 5:09
 "There Is No Greater Love" (Isham Jones, Marty Symes) – 5:56
 "Morning" (Roland Hanna) – 6:36
 "Walkin'" (Richard Carpenter) – 4:15
 "Bye Bye Blackbird" (Ray Henderson, Mort Dixon) – 2:47	
 "Back Home in Indiana" (Hanna) – 4:20 Additional track on CD reissue
 "If You Could See Me Now" (Tadd Dameron) – 6:15 Additional track on CD reissue
 "This Is All I Ask" (Gordon Jenkins) – 6:33 Additional track on CD reissue

Personnel 
Roland Hanna – piano

References 

1973 albums
Roland Hanna albums
Solo piano jazz albums